Michael S. Engel, FLS, FRES (born September 24, 1971) is an American paleontologist and entomologist, notable for contributions to insect evolutionary biology and classification.  In connection with his studies he has undertaken field expeditions in Central Asia, Asia Minor, the Levant, Arabia, eastern Africa, the high Arctic, and South and North America, and has published more than 983 papers in scientific journals and over 925 new living and fossil species. Some of Engel's research images were included in exhibitions on the aesthetic value of scientific imagery.

Career
Engel received a B.Sc. in physiology and cell biology and a B.A. in chemistry from the University of Kansas in 1993, and a Ph.D. in entomology from Cornell University in 1998.  He was employed as a research scientist at the American Museum of Natural History from 1998–2000, and then returned to the University of Kansas as assistant professor in the Department of Entomology, assistant professor in the Department of Ecology and Evolutionary Biology, and assistant curator in the Natural History Museum’s Division of Entomology.  He was promoted to full professor and senior curator in 2008, and University Distinguished Professor in 2018.   In 2006–2007 Engel resumed regular activity in the American Museum of Natural History while a Guggenheim Fellow, completing work on the geological history of termites and their influence on carbon recycling in paleoenvironments.  This period also permitted significant work on the comprehensive work, Treatise on the Termites of the World.  In 2008 he received the Charles Schuchert Award of the Paleontological Society and subsequently the Bicentenary Medal of the Linnean Society of London (2009) for his contributions to the fields of systematic entomology and paleontology.  In Spring 2014 he was awarded the Scholarly Achievement Award of the University of Kansas for his contributions to the evolutionary and developmental origins of insect flight; and in 2015 the International Cooperation Award from the Chinese Academy of Sciences. In 2017, Engel was elected as a Fellow of the Entomological Society of America and received the society's Thomas Say Award. In Spring 2019, Innumerable Insects won a Silver Award in the Nautilus Book Award.

Personal life 
Engel married Kellie K. Magill on April 25, 2009, in a ceremony performed by Engel's father.

Eponymy
The following species or genera have been proposed in honor of Dr. Engel, ( denotes extinct taxa):

 Anotylus engeli Makranczy, 2011 (an oxyteline rove beetle from Bolivia)
 † Archaeoellipes engeli Heads, 2010 (a pygmy mole cricket from Miocene Dominican Amber)
 †Archaeoserphites engeli Rasnitsyn & Ohm-Kuhnle, 2020 (an archaeoserphitid wasp in Burmese amber)
 †Archaeovespa engeli Wu, Shih, Ren, & Gao, 2021 (a vespid wasp in Kachin amber)
 † Archeofoenus engeli Turrisi & Ellenberger, 2019 (an aulacid wasp from Cretaceous Burmese amber)
 Braunsapis engeli Jobiraj, 2004 (a small allodapine bee from southern India)
 †Chlorepyris engeli Colombo & Azevedo, 2021 (a flat wasp in Baltic amber)
 † Cretogramma engeli Liu et al., 2018 (a kalligrammatid lacewing from Cretaceous Burmese amber)
 † Cretopiesma engelgrimaldii Azar, Heiss, & Huang, 2020 (a flat bug from Cretaceous Burmese amber)
 † Cretoquadratus engeli Chen, 2019 (a ship-timber beetles from Cretaceous Burmese amber)
  Cretostylops engeli Grimaldi & Kathirithamby, 2005 (the oldest fossil Strepsiptera, from Burmese amber)
 † Deltoxyela engeli Wang, Shih, Ren, & Gao, 2020 (a sawfly from Cretaceous Burmese amber)
 † Dolichoraphidia engeli Liu & al., 2016 (a snakefly from Cretaceous Burmese amber)
 † Elmomantis engeli Prokop et al., 2017 (a miomopteran from the Permian of Kansas)
 † Engellestes Nel & al., 2012 (a genus of damselfly-like odonates from the Permian of Russia)
 Eufriesea engeli Gonzalez & Griswold, 2017 (an orchid bee from Mexico)
 † Kronocharon engeli Wunderlich, 2015 (a whipspider from Cretaceous Burmese amber)
 Lasioglossum engeli Genaro, 2001 (a halictine bee from Cuba)
 Melitta engeli Michez, 2012 (a melittine bee from Kyrgyzstan)
 † Mesophthirus engeli Gao, Shih, Rasnitsyn, & Ren, 2019 (a coccoid crawler from Cretaceous Burmese amber)
 †Mesoserphites engeli Herbert & McKellar, 2022 (a serphitid wasp in Burmese amber)
 †Milesitermes engeli Jouault & Nel, 2021 (a termite in Burmese amber)
 † Sigmophlebia engeli Béthoux & Beckemeyer, 2007 (a protorthopteran from the Early Permian of Oklahoma)
 Sphecodes engeli Astafurova & Proshchalykin, 2020 (a cuckoo bee from Laos)
 Triepeolus engeli Rightmyer, 2008 (an epeoline bee from Texas)
 † Xenosycorax engeli Azar & Salamé, 2015 (a psychodid fly in New Jersey amber)

Publications

Books
Evolution of the Insects (Cambridge Evolution Series), co-authored with David Grimaldi, 2005.

Innumerable Insects: The Story of the Most Diverse and Myriad Animals on Earth (Natural Histories), 2018.

References

External links
 Dr. Michael Engel faculty members'page at The University of Kansas, Department of Ecology & Evolutionary Biology.
 Michael S. Engel bio as Fellow John Simon Guggenheim  Foundation

1971 births
Living people
People from St. Louis County, Missouri
American paleontologists
American entomologists
Hymenopterists
Fellows of the Linnean Society of London
Cornell University College of Agriculture and Life Sciences alumni
Evolutionary biologists
American naturalists
21st-century American zoologists
University of Kansas alumni
University of Kansas faculty
United Church of Christ members
People associated with the American Museum of Natural History
Fellows of the Entomological Society of America
Nautilus Book Award winners